Francine M. Misasi (May 25, 1944 – June 10, 2001) was an American politician from New York.

Life
She was born on May 25, 1944, in Glasco, Ulster County, New York. She graduated from Saugerties High School in 1962.

In 1973, she moved to Albany, and became a committee clerk of the New York State Legislature. Later she was a chief committee clerk, and was Journal Clerk of the Assembly from 1979 to 1984.

She was Clerk of the New York State Assembly from 1985 to 2000, officiating in the 186th, 187th, 188th, 189th, 190th, 191st, 192nd and 193rd New York State Legislatures.

She died on June 10, 2001.

References

1944 births
2001 deaths
People from Saugerties, New York
New York (state) Democrats
Women in New York (state) politics
Politicians from Albany, New York
Clerks of the New York State Assembly
20th-century American women
20th-century American people